The Electoral district of Town of Melbourne (later known as Electoral district of City of Melbourne) was an electorate of the New South Wales Legislative Council before it became part of the Colony of Victoria on 1 July 1851.

History
Settlers of the Port Phillip District had wanted representation in the New South Wales Legislative Council for some time. In 1843 a representative for the Town of Melbourne (and five members for the Electoral district of Port Phillip). were elected; "But the colonists were not satisfied with government from and by Sydney".

On 1 July 1851, the Port Phillip district (which included Melbourne) was separated from New South Wales under provisions of the Australian Colonies Government Act 1850, and became the Colony of Victoria and the Victorian Legislative Council was created.

Members

Election results

1843

1844

Condell resigned in February 1844.

1848

1850

As Earl Grey had never set foot in the colony, he did not attend the Legislative Council and his seat was vacated by his absence on 31 October 1850.

References

1847 Directory for the District of Port Phillip

Former electoral districts of New South Wales Legislative Council
History of Victoria (Australia)
History of New South Wales
1843 establishments in Australia
1851 disestablishments in Australia